Wiener Blut – Die 3 von 144   is an Austrian television series.

See also
List of Austrian television series

Austrian television series
ORF (broadcaster)
2008 Austrian television series debuts
2008 Austrian television series endings
2000s Austrian television series
German-language television shows